Harry C. Batchelder Rink was the first artificial ice surface operated by the University of New Hampshire. The equipment needed to produce the ice was donated by UNH alum Harry C. Batchelder and the rink opened in February 1955 next to the previous natural ice rink used by the men's ice hockey team. The rink was in operation for about ten years before indoor Snively Arena was opened in 1965. During its existence the rink had a chain-link fence installed for hockey games.

References

College ice hockey venues in the United States
Outdoor ice hockey venues in the United States
Sports venues in New Hampshire
University of New Hampshire buildings
New Hampshire Wildcats men's ice hockey
Buildings and structures in Strafford County, New Hampshire
1955 establishments in New Hampshire
1965 disestablishments in New Hampshire
Sports venues completed in 1955
University and college buildings completed in 1955